M. giganteus may refer to:
 Machairodus giganteus, a large saber-toothed cat species found in Europe, Asia, Africa and North America during the Miocene and Pleistocene
 Macronectes giganteus, the southern giant petrel, a large seabird species of the southern oceans
 Macropus giganteus, the eastern grey kangaroo, a marsupial species found in Australia
 Mastigoproctus giganteus, the giant vinegarroon, a whip scorpion species found in the southern United States
 Mastodonsaurus giganteus, an extinct amphibian species from the Triassic
 Megadytes giganteus, a large diving beetle species found in the Caribbean and in South America
 Megaloceros giganteus, the Irish elk or giant deer, an extinct mammal species found across Eurasia during the Late Pleistocene
 Menodus giganteus, an extinct brontothere species
 Meripilus giganteus, a mushroom species
 Miscanthus giganteus, a large perennial grass hybrid of Miscanthus sinensis and Miscanthus sacchariflorus native to Japan
 Mosasaurus giganteus, an extinct carnivorous aquatic lizard species that lived during the Cretaceous